Zirak (also Romanized as Zīrak; also known as Zirg) is a village in Kahshang Rural District, in the Central District of Birjand County, South Khorasan Province, Iran. At the 2016 census, its population was 165, in 55 families.

References 

Populated places in Birjand County